The School of International Relations (or SIR) is an institute of higher education in Iran. The school trains an international student body, and is run by the Iranian Ministry of Foreign Affairs, under the supervision of the Iranian Ministry of Science, Research and Technology.

More than 750 of the school's graduates have held diplomatic and government positions inside and outside Iran.

SIR houses the Iranian Diplomatic Training Center (DTC) who trains domestic as well as foreign young diplomats. The DTC has trained more than 1000 diplomats from 60 nations.
Professors of this school are mostly among the famous Iranian diplomats, mostly working in international organizations such as UN or in Embassies around the world.

Mohammad Javad Zarif is a faculty member of the school.

Iason Athanasiadis is a graduate of the school.

Faculty members
Mohammad Javad Zarif, Foreign Minister
Abbas Araghchi, Deputy Foreign Minister
Mohammad Kazem Sajjadpour, Head of the Institute for Political and International Studies (IPIS)  
Mehdi Fakheri, former Agent Geneva
Mehdi Danesh Yazdi, Deputy Foreign Minister
Mohammad Reza Dehshiri, Iran's ambassador to Senegal
Mansour Rahmani, member of IISS
Sohrab Shahabi, former Minister's adviser
Saeed Agha Banihashemi, former ambassador in Hungary

References

External links

Schools in Iran